Torneo Argentino B was one of two leagues that form the fourth level of the Argentine football league system, made up of 100+ teams playing within eight regional zones across Argentina.

The other league at level four wasand still isthe Primera C Metropolitana, which is a competition for the numerous clubs in the city of Buenos Aires and the Greater Buenos Aires metropolitan area.

The Torneo Argentino B season would end with the top teams from each zone playing in cross-over playoffs, culminating with overall champions and a number of teams (varied by season) eligible for promotion to the following season's Torneo Argentino A competition.

The Torneo Argentino B was replaced with the similar Torneo Federal B for the 2014–15 season (itself reorganized as the nine zone Torneo Regional Federal Amateur for the 2018–19 season ), while the Primera C continued on as its tier four companion for the Buenos Aires area.

List of champions
European-styled seasons

See also
Argentine football league system
List of football clubs in Argentina

External links
Torneo Argentino B at AFA website

 
Defunct football leagues in Argentina
Fourth level football leagues of South America